The Algésiras class consisted of five second-rank, 90-gun, steam-powered ships of the line built for the French Navy in the 1850s. Most of the ships participated in the Second Italian War of Independence in 1859 or the Second French intervention in Mexico in the 1860s. Beginning in the mid-1860s, they were decommissioned or converted into troopships before being scrapped beginning in the early 1870s.

Description
The Algésiras-class ships were repeats of the pioneering ship of the line  and were also designed by naval architect Henri Dupuy de Lôme. Their crew numbered 913 officers and ratings.

The primary difference between Napoléon and the Algésiras class was that the boilers of the latter ships were moved forward of the engines. They were powered by a pair of either horizontal-return connecting-rod or trunk steam engine that drove the single propeller shaft using steam provided by eight boilers. The ships could carry  of coal.

The armament of the Algésiras-class ships generally consisted of eighteen 36-pounder smoothbore cannon and sixteen  Paixhans guns on the lower gundeck and thirty-four 30-pounder  cannon on the upper gundeck. On the quarterdeck and forecastle were twenty  Paixhans guns and a pair of 163 mm rifled muzzle-loading guns. , converted into a troopship while still under construction, was armed only with four 30-pounder cannon.

Ships

Citations

Bibliography

 
90-gun ship of the line classes
Ship of the line classes from France
 
Napoléon-class ships of the line
Ship classes of the French Navy